In mathematics, the Peters polynomials sn(x) are polynomials studied by  given by the generating function

, . They are a generalization of the Boole polynomials.

See also
Umbral calculus

References

 Reprinted by Dover, 2005

Polynomials